Events from the year 1734 in Ireland.

Incumbent
Monarch: George II

Events
April 29
Act prohibits converts from Roman Catholicism to the Church of Ireland from educating their children in the old religion or from becoming Justices of Peace.
Act for relief of creditors of failed banks.
May 19 – George Berkeley is consecrated as Church of Ireland Bishop of Cloyne.
August 17 – Mercer's Hospital for the sick and poor in Dublin is founded under a bequest of Mary Mercer.

Arts and literature
March – upper gallery of the Smock Alley Theatre in Dublin collapses for the third time.
November – George Faulkner begins publication of an edition of Jonathan Swift's Works in Dublin with a corrected text.

Births
July 25 – Arthur Gore, 2nd Earl of Arran, politician (d. 1809)
Boetius Egan, Roman Catholic Archbishop of Tuam (d. 1798)

Deaths
September 28 – James Hamilton, 6th Earl of Abercorn (b. c.1661)
Richard Cantillon, economic theorist (b. 1680)

References

 
Years of the 18th century in Ireland
Ireland
1730s in Ireland